Cheshmeh Godar may refer to:
 Cheshmeh Godar, Kermanshah